The following is a list of 2020 box office number-one films in Paraguay.

Films

Biggest opening week
This list charts films that had openings in excess of 50,000 tickets sold in their first week.

See also 
 Lists of box office number-one films
 2020 in film

References

External links 
Ultracine

2020
Paraguay
2020 in Paraguay